The Dress is a Polish graduation short drama film from the Warsaw Film School, written and directed by . The film covers the topics of disability and intimacy, sexual assault and loneliness. It premiered at the Kraków Film Festival on June 2, 2020, and received a nomination for the Academy Award for Best Live Action Short Film at the 94th Academy Awards.

Plot
Julia, a woman of short stature in her thirties, longs for love, intimacy and a relationship. After her work shift cleaning motel rooms, she sits in a local pub to play on slot machines, until she meets Bogdan. Before the dream date, however, Julia needs to buy a new dress.

Cast
 Anna Dzieduszycka as Julka
 Dorota Pomykała as Renata
 Szymon Piotr Warszawski as Bogdan

Reception
The film covers the topics of disability and intimacy, sexual assault and loneliness. The film has been praised for his authentic disability representation still hard to find in the cinema industry.

Accolades
The short film has been screened over 60 film festivals around the world, and awarded 17 times, including:

References

External links
 
 The Dress | Sukienka Film on Vimeo

2020 films
2020 short films
2020 drama films
Polish short films
Polish drama films